A Woman Reading is an oil-on-canvas painting by French artist Jean-Baptiste-Camille Corot, created in 1869. The painting is now in the Metropolitan Museum of Art in New York. 

The painting depicts a woman reading a book; in the distance to her left there is a man in a boat. Corot, whose reputation was made as a landscape painter, painted many images of solitary, pensive women in his later years. Femme Lisant, which was shown at the Salon of 1869, is the only one of them that he exhibited in his lifetime.

When the 72-year-old painter exhibited the canvas at the Salon in 1869, Théophile Gautier praised the sincere naivete and palette of the painting, but criticized the heroine's clumsy drawing, noting the few figures in the artists work. After the Salon, Corot returned to the canvas, remodeling the landscape, but left the figure unchanged.

The painting was donated to the Metropolitan Museum of Art in 1928 by Louise Senff Cameron, in memory of her uncle Charles H. Senff.

References

1869 paintings
Paintings by Jean-Baptiste-Camille Corot
Paintings in the collection of the Metropolitan Museum of Art
Books in art
Ships in art
Paintings of women